The Zhenfeng Pagoda in Anqing City, Anhui Province, People's Republic of China, is a Buddhist pagoda originally built in 1570 during the Ming Dynasty. Due to its location near a bend in the Yangtze River, the pagoda was formerly used as a lighthouse, and contains niches for lanterns. 
After construction, the pagoda was initially called the "Ten-thousand Buddha" pagoda due to its interior containing over six hundred Buddha statues.

Structure
Above the windows on each floor are a set of flying eaves. From the first to the sixth floor, arched doorways lead to an outside balcony. A total of 168 stairs inside the pagoda allow access to the top floor. The walls are tapered slightly, shaping the structure into a partial cone.

References

Pagodas in China
Major National Historical and Cultural Sites in Anhui
Buildings and structures completed in 1570
Buildings and structures in Anqing
1570 establishments in China
Buddhist temples in Anhui
Ming dynasty architecture